Committees are an important element of the Jatiya Sangsad, as in most modern legislatures.

Bangladesh has three types of parliamentary committees: standing, select, and special. Standing committees are normally constituted for the duration of the parliament, whereas select and special committees are temporary entities created as needed and dissolved when their task is complete.

The Constitution of Bangladesh mandates a minimum of two parliamentary committees: a Public Accounts Committee and a Privileges Committee. Parliament's Rules of Procedure requires additional committees, including one to shadow each government ministry.

Standing committees typically have between 8 and 15 members. Committees sit in private, their meetings are not open to the public or the media.

The standing committees that parallel government ministries, and two financial ones: the Standing Committee on Public Accounts, and Committee on Public Undertakings are widely viewed as the most important ones for oversight and  government accountability. Professor of public administration Nizam Ahmed said of Bangladeshi parliamentary committees that "although they do not appear to be good watchdogs, neither can they be considered as poodles." They have little bite - little direct effect on government actions - but their bark can publicise issues and air disagreements. Taiabur Rahman, another academic in the field, wrote that the Bangladesh Parliament has "a weak committee system with marginal scope in ensuring executive accountability."

List of committees
In the 10th parliamentary sessions, there were 50 committees.

 Committee on Estimates
 Committee on Government Assurances
 Standing Committee on Public Accounts
 Library Committee
 Committee on Petitions
 Committee on Private Member's Bills and Resolutions
 Standing Committee of Privileges
 House Committee
 Business Advisory Committee
 Standing Committee on Rules of Procedure
 Standing Committee on Ministry of Law, Justice and Parliamentary Affairs
 Standing Committee on Ministry of Commerce
 Standing Committee on Ministry of Cultural Affairs
 Standing Committee on Ministry of Disaster Management & Relief
 Standing Committee on Ministry of Railway
 Standing Committee on Ministry of Hill Tracts
 Standing Committee on Ministry of Science and Technology
 Standing Committee on Ministry of Youth and Sports
 Standing Committee on Ministry of Housing and Public Works
 Standing Committee on Ministry of Primary and Mass Education
 Standing Committee on Ministry of Social Welfare
 Standing Committee on Ministry of Land
 Standing Committee on Ministry of Agriculture
 Standing Committee on Ministry of Defence
 Standing Committee on Ministry of Forest and Environment
 Standing Committee on Ministry of Textile and Jute
 Standing Committee on Ministry of Food
 Standing Committee on Ministry of Fisheries & Livestock
 Standing Committee on Ministry of Women and Children Affairs
 Standing Committee on Ministry of Power, Energy and Mineral Resources
 Standing Committee on Ministry of Road Transport and Bridge
 Standing Committee on Ministry of Shipping
 Standing Committee on Ministry of Civil Aviation and Tourism
 Standing Committee on Ministry of Labour and Employment
 Standing Committee on Ministry of Information
 Standing Committee on Ministry of Religious Affairs
 Standing Committee on Ministry of Post Tele Communication & Information Technology
 Standing Committee on Ministry of Health and Family Planning
 Standing Committee on Ministry of Education
 Standing Committee on Ministry of Administration
 Standing Committee on Ministry of Expatriates Welfare and Overseas Employment
 Standing Committee on Ministry of Foreign Affairs
 Standing Committee on Ministry of Industry
 Standing Committee on Ministry of Liberation War
 Standing Committee on Ministry of Home Affairs
 Standing Committee on Ministry of Water Resources
 Standing Committee on Ministry of Local Government, Rural Development & Co-operatives
 Standing Committee on Ministry of Planning
 Standing Committee on Ministry of Finance
 Committee on Public Undertakings

References

Parliament of Bangladesh